The 2022 San Marino and Rimini Riviera motorcycle Grand Prix (officially known as the Gran Premio Gryfyn di San Marino e della Riviera di Rimini) was the fourteenth round of the 2022 Grand Prix motorcycle racing season, and the sixth and final round of the 2022 MotoE World Cup. All races (except MotoE race 1 which was held on 3 September) were held at the Misano World Circuit Marco Simoncelli in Misano Adriatico on 4 September 2022.

The two independent Ducati teams, Gresini Racing and Mooney VR46 Racing Team used a special livery in this race. Gresini Racing uses a special livery as a form of respect for the late Fausto Gresini. Meanwhile, Mooney VR46 Racing Team wears a special livery to continue Valentino Rossi's tradition of using a helmet with a special design every race in Italy. The special livery called Aeroprism was designed by Michah Dowbak aka Mad Dog Jones. Some of the designs are inspired by the livery that Valentino Rossi used at Mugello in 1999 when he was still in the 250cc class.

Background

Riders' entries 
In the MotoGP class, in addition to Stefan Bradl who continues to replace Marc Márquez in the Repsol Honda Team, Kazuki Watanabe takes the place of Joan Mir in the Team Suzuki Ecstar, due to the ankle injury suffered by the Spanish rider in the Austrian Grand Prix; Michele Pirro runs for the fourth time this season as a wildcard. This is the last Grand Prix for Andrea Dovizioso who has decided to retire; for the remaining races the WithU Yamaha RNF MotoGP Team bike will be driven by test rider Cal Crutchlow. In the Moto2 class, two riders race with the wildcard: Rory Skinner, in the third consecutive race with American Racing, and Mattia Pasini, in his second season after Mugello, with GasGas Aspar Team. Australian driver Senna Agius (Elf Marc VDS Racing Team) and Japanese Taiga Hada (Pertamina Mandalika SAG Team) respectively replace the injured Sam Lowes and Gabriel Rodrigo. In the Moto3 class, the Italian Nicola Carraro continues to replace his compatriot Matteo Bertelle in the QJmotor Avintia Racing Team, while the Australian Harrison Voight runs as a wildcard in the Sic58 Squadra Corse. In the MotoE class, at the last two races of this edition, the riders are the same as in the entry list of the season with no further substitutes.

MotoGP Championship standings before the race 
Fabio Quartararo increases his advantage over Aleix Espargaró in the riders' standings (200 points for the first, 168 for the second). The latter has twelve points ahead of Francesco Bagnaia, winner in Austria and his third consecutive success. Johann Zarco and Jack Miller are fourth and fifth with 125 and 123 points respectively. In the constructors' standings, Ducati continues to lead the standings with 296 points with a large advantage over their rivals: +96 on Yamaha, +111 on Aprilia, +156 on KTM, +178 on Suzuki and +206 on Honda. In the team standings, Ducati Lenovo Team overtakes Aprilia Racing in the lead (279 points for the former, 253 for the latter). Monster Energy Yamaha MotoGP is third with 226 points, with a lead of 14 and 34 points respectively over Prima Pramac Racing and Red Bull KTM Factory Racing.

Moto2 Championship standings before the race 
In the riders' standings, Ai Ogura, thanks to Spielberg's victory, overtakes Augusto Fernández at the head by just one point (183 vs 182 points). Celestino Vietti is third with 156 points, followed by Arón Canet and Joe Roberts with 137 and 108 points respectively. In the constructors' classification, Kalex (who has already won the title arithmetically) has full points with 325 points, followed by Boscoscuro (86 points) and MV Agusta (5 points). In the team standings, Idemitsu Honda Team Asia overtook in first position (275 points) against Red Bull KTM Ajo, five points away. Flexbox HP40 is third with 212 points, with a lead of 52 and 53 points respectively over GasGas Aspar Team and Elf Marc VDS Racing Team.

Moto3 Championship standings before the race 
Sergio García's advantage slightly increases (193 points) over his team-mate Izan Guevara, now five points behind the top of the riders' standings. Dennis Foggia (144 points), Ayumu Sasaki (winner in the previous race, 138 points) and Jaume Masià and Deniz Öncü (127 points either) follow. In the constructors' classification, the gap between Gas Gas (first at 246 points) and Honda (second at 226 points) is reduced to twenty. KTM is third with 210 points, Husqvarna is fourth with 167 points, CFMoto closes the ranking with 103 points. The team classification is largely led by GasGas Aspar Team with 381 points, with an advantage of 123 points over Leopard Racing; followed by Red Bull KTM Ajo, third at 183 points, Sterilgarda Husqvarna Max fourth at 178 points and Red Bull KTM Tech3 fifth at 156 points.

MotoE Cup standings before the race 
Dominique Aegerter reaches the last two races in the lead with 194 points, with a 17.5 point lead over Eric Granado. Matteo Ferrari is third with 121.5 points, followed by Miquel Pons (115 points) and Mattia Casadei (111 points).

Free practice

MotoGP

Combinated Free Practice 1-2-3 
The top ten riders (written in bold) qualified in Q2.

Moto2

Combinated Free Practice 
The top fourteen riders (written in bold) qualified in Q2.

Qualifying

MotoGP

Race

MotoGP

Moto2

Moto3 

 Sergio García was black flagged for irresponsible riding.

MotoE

Race 1 

All bikes manufactured by Energica.

Race 2 

All bikes manufactured by Energica.

Championship standings after the race
Below are the standings for the top five riders, constructors, and teams after the round.

MotoGP

Riders' Championship standings

Constructors' Championship standings

Teams' Championship standings

Moto2

Riders' Championship standings

Constructors' Championship standings

Teams' Championship standings

Moto3

Riders' Championship standings

Constructors' Championship standings

Teams' Championship standings

MotoE

References

External links

2022 MotoGP race reports
2022 in Italian motorsport
2022
September 2022 sports events in Italy